Dumar Lal Baitha (1924-1997) was an Indian politician, agriculturist and lawyer. He was elected to the Lower House of the Indian Parliament, the Lok Sabha from Araria, Bihar as a member of the Indian National Congress.

Education 
Education at Lee Academy, Forbesganj, Patna University; B.N.College, Patna University; Ara Jain College, Bihar University and Patna Law College, Patna University.

Political Career (1948-1989) 
Was District Welfare Officer, Government of Bihar, 1948-1951.

Parliamentary Secretary, Government of Bihar for Law, Jails, Religious Trust, River Valley Projects, Irrigation, Electricity Departments, 1960-1963.

Minister of State for Welfare and Housing, 1963-1967 and Cabinet Minister for Health, Labour and Education, 1967-1972.

Chairman, (i) Employment Review Board for Scheduled Castes and Scheduled Tribes, Bihar, 1972-1974, (ii) Kosi Anchal Vikas Sangh, (iii) Bihar State Users of Power for Agriculture Association and (v) Railways Convention Committee, 1980-1984.

President (i) Bihar State Scheduled Castes Welfare Committee, (ii) Bihar Landless Labourers and Share Croppers Association, (iii) Lok Sevak Sangh, Bihar, (iv) Ambedkar Seva Sadan, Araria, (v) Kosi Anchal Vikas Sangh, (vi) Bihar Pradesh Congress Committee, 1985-1988.

Member, (i) Bihar Legislative Assembly, 1952-1972, (ii)Bihar Public Service Commission, 1974-1977, (iii)7th Lok Sabha, 1980-1984, (iv) 8th Lok Sabha, 1984-1989, (v) Committee on Private Members Bills and Resolutions, 1980-1982 and (vi) National Commission for Scheduled Castes & Scheduled Tribes, 1986-1988.

Working President for Bihar State 20 Point Programme Implementation.

Deputy Minister for Food and Civil Supplies, Government of India, 1988-1989.

Raksha Rajya Mantri from July 4, 1989 to December 1, 1989.

Social activities 
Working (i) for the upliftment of Scheduled Castes and Scheduled Tribes and other backward communities in general; and education of their children in particular, (ii) for the development of Kosi area, (iii) for the implementation of Land Reforms and (iv) for the development of rural areas, providing employment to the rural labourers, etc.

Foreign visit 
He visited the USSR in August, 1987 as a member of a delegation to celebrate the 40th anniversary of Independence of India.

Personal life 
He married Abharani Devi on 16 June 1942. The couple had three daughters and three sons, of whom two sons died early.

Death 
He died of kidney-related issues at Dr. Ram Manohar Lohia Hospital on 10 February 1997 and his wife, Smt. Abharani Devi, died ten years later, on 9 February 2007.

References

External links
Official biographical sketch in Parliament of India website

Indian National Congress politicians
1924 births
India MPs 1980–1984
Lok Sabha members from Bihar
1997 deaths